Robert Troxell "Ray" Knode (January 28, 1901 – April 13, 1982) was an American  Major League Baseball baseball and college football player. He played for four seasons as a first baseman with the Cleveland Indians from 1923 to 1926.

Knode attended the University of Maryland, where he played on the football team as a quarterback from 1916 to 1919. He later attended the University of Michigan, where he also played quarterback from 1921 to 1922.

His older brother, Kenneth T. Knode followed a similar career path. He played professional baseball with the St. Louis Cardinals and as a quarterback at both Maryland and Michigan.

References

External links

1901 births
1982 deaths
Major League Baseball first basemen
Waynesboro Villagers players
American football quarterbacks
Maryland Terrapins football players
Michigan Wolverines football players
Cleveland Indians players
Baseball players from Maryland
Maryland Terrapins baseball players